Leomon Moreno da Silva (born 21 August 1993) is a member of Brazil men's national goalball team. He was on the team that won silver in Goalball at the 2012 Summer Paralympics, bronze in Goalball at the 2016 Summer Paralympics and gold in Goalball at the 2020 Summer Paralympics. He has retinitis pigmentosa.

References

External links 
 

1993 births
Living people
Male goalball players
Paralympic bronze medalists for Brazil
Paralympic silver medalists for Brazil
Paralympic gold medalists for Brazil
Paralympic medalists in goalball
Goalball players at the 2012 Summer Paralympics
Goalball players at the 2016 Summer Paralympics
Goalball players at the 2020 Summer Paralympics
Medalists at the 2012 Summer Paralympics
Medalists at the 2016 Summer Paralympics
Medalists at the 2020 Summer Paralympics
Paralympic goalball players of Brazil
21st-century Brazilian people